Midsumma Festival is an annual celebration of LGBTQIA+ arts and cultures held annually for 22 days across January and February in Melbourne, Australia. The festival began as a one-week celebration of LGBTQIA+ pride in 1989. The festival has since expanded to a three-week event that attracts over 280,000 people each year. The festival is now one of the top gay and lesbian arts and cultural celebrations, along with those held in New York, San Francisco, Vancouver and Sydney.

Although the primary festival is held in the summer, Midsumma works year-round to provide artists, social changers, and culture makers with support and tools to create, present, and promote their work. Midsumma is an open-access festival. Each year over 5000 culture makers, artists and performers present their shows or works in over 100 Melbourne venues over the 22-day festival. The two main categories are Performing Arts and Visual Arts.

Midsumma's visual arts program features exhibitions in and around Melbourne from local, national and international LGBTQIA+ artists. Yarra Arts and Queer City are home to many of the exhibitions.

The festival's performing arts program includes musicals, theatre, cabaret, film, spoken word, music events and dance parties. These performing arts events are largely produced by local community members.

Midsumma Carnival 
Midsumma Carnival is held during the event's opening weekend and is traditionally held in Alexandra Gardens with stalls, food, and entertainment from 11am to 11pm. The main stage includes entertainment from the upcoming festival program to showcase and promote later events.

Stages: Main Stage and Picnic Stage

Precincts: Sports, Youth, Family, Tea Tent (for older audiences) and a Chill Out Zone

T Dance
The day is brought to a close with the T Dance, Midsumma's dance party under the stars. Artists who have performed at T Dance include Slinkee Minx, Trevor Ashley, Ricki-Lee, Paul Heron, Inaya Day, and the Divine Knights.

Queer City 
Queer City was a collaboration between City of Melbourne, Arts Victoria, Midsumma, and local galleries and artists from the gay community.  In 2012 the Queer City was focused around 1000 Pound Bend Gallery and performance venue in Little Lonsdale St, Melbourne along with City Library and a new exhibition space known as Mailbox 141 on 141 Flinders Lane which has been converted into a small art exhibition space.

There is an exhibition of Vivien St James' work, a celebration of fluid or 'unstable' genders at Platform Space, as well as exhibitions at Guilford Lane Gallery and forty-five more downstairs.

Yarra Arts 

Yarra Arts is the collaboration between the City of Yarra, Arts Victoria, Midsumma, local galleries and artists from the LGBTQIA+ community.

In 2009, this exhibition series featured a premier event from T.J. Bateson, a group show, TransMasculinities, which explored aspects of gender, as well as a range of work at the artist-run gallery initiative 69 Smith Street in Melbourne's Fitzroy. T.J.Bateson's new body of work, Veiled in Plain Sight, was created specifically for Midsumma celebrating the relaunch of Tacit Contemporary Art in Abbotsford. It was off the back of the exhibition series, Transmen Translated in 2008, that artist and curator Jesslyn Moss brought together TransMasculinities, a Midsumma group show featuring photography, painting, drawing and video by eight FTM artists from Australia, the UK and the United States.  The exhibition explored new ideas of masculinity and offered an insight into the physical and psychological aspects of transgender butch, gender queer and transmasculine experiences, and was shown at Red Gallery. 69 Smith Street featured work from Benja, Mark Bareald, Gary Campbell, J. Kristensen, Piepke, Mel Simpson and Rat Simpson and explored concepts of identity, relationship and material assumptions through photography, and playful work portraying women's relationships with each other and the open road. The 2009 Yarra Arts Exhibition was launched on Wednesday January 20th at 69 Smith Street Gallery.

In 2012, Ross Watson presented their 25th Anniversary exhibition series entitle Cycles & Sequences which explored cycles of life, notions of time and endurance, change and transition in today's disposable society. Cycles & Sequences included the first ever paintings of the Bel Ami stars, Lukas Ridgeston, Kris Evan and Dolph Lambert. Celebrating positive gay role models in their art has been an important aspect of Watson's work, and this exhibition featured Lance Corporal James Wharton II, who appeared on the front cover of the U.K.'s Armed Forces magazine in 2009, as a soldier who is openly gay.

Registered events
The majority of Midsumma Festival events are within the umbrella events program, which are created, produced and funded by independent third parties who pay fees for inclusion in the Midsumma Festival. In 2012 there were approximately 160 events.

Midsumma Boards and Management
 Midsumma Festival Inc. is an incorporated association.
 The Chair of Midsumma Festival is John Caldwell.
 The Board of Midsumma Festival includes Dr. Jane Daniels, Rodney George, Dean Hamood (Treasurer), Aaron Hockly, Rachel "Rat" Simpson, and Kate Wickett. Mark Latchford resigned in March 2012.
 The Festival Manager is Monique Thorpe.

2011
 Chair: Lisa Watts
 General Manager: Adam J Lowe

2010
 Chair: Lisa Watts
 General Manager: Adam J Lowe

2009
 Chair: Lisa Watts
 General Manager: Adam J Lowe

2008
 Chair: Lisa Watts
 General Manager: Jarrod Hughes
 Festival Administrator: Molly Whelan

2007
 General Manager: Jarrod Hughes
 Festival Administrator: Molly Whelan

2019

 Chief Executive: Karen Bryant 
 Programming Manager: Daniel Santangeli 
 Finance & Office Manager: Angus Li
 Marketing Manager: Felicity McIntosh
 Administrator: Matt Hirst 
 Communications & Website: Alan Drummond

See also

 List of LGBT events
 Australian Queer Archives holds archival material relating to the Midsumma Festival

References

Gallery 

Festivals in Melbourne
Pride parades in Australia
Organisations based in Melbourne
1989 establishments in Australia
Recurring events established in 1989
LGBT culture in Melbourne
Festivals established in 1989

af:Midsomerfees